Guarana is an energy drink produced by Knjaz Miloš a.d., a producer based in Aranđelovac, Serbia. The drink is popular within Serbia, and is made from extracts of the guarana plant, which contains caffeine (sometimes called "guaranine"), theophylline, and theobromine. Guarana has a caffeine content equivalent to, or more than, most energy drinks.

Ingredients
Ingredients include carbonated water, sugar, citric acid, taurine, guarana seed extract, caffeine, vitamin C, niacin, pantothenic acid, vitamin B6, vitamin B12, sodium benzoate and coloring.

External links
Official site of Guarana 

Serbian drinks
Guarana sodas
Energy drinks